Muschampia proto, the sage skipper, is a butterfly of the  family Hesperiidae. It is found in Morocco, Algeria, the Iberian Peninsula and southern France.

The length of the forewings is 14–15 mm, although there are specimens with a forewing length of 15–17 mm in Morocco. This is a rather variable species but usually has a well-marked central spot on the forewing to distinguish it from similar species. Adults are on wing in April, May or even later in one generation.

The larvae feed on Phlomis species.

References
Whalley, Paul - Mitchell Beazley Guide to Butterflies (1981, reprinted 1992)

External links
Lepiforum
Moths and Butterflies of Europe and North Africa
Butterfly Conservation Armenia
Muschampia proto occurrence data from GBIF

Muschampia
Butterflies of Europe
Butterflies described in 1816
Butterflies of Africa
Taxa named by Ferdinand Ochsenheimer